The King's Knight Opening is a chess opening consisting of the moves:

1. e4 e5
2. Nf3

White's second move attacks the e-pawn. Black usually defends this with 2...Nc6, which leads to several named openings. Of the alternatives, the most important are Petrov's Defense (2...Nf6) and Philidor's Defense (2...d6).

Main line: 2...Nc6

Most games (more than 80%) continue with 2...Nc6.

Some moves from here include:
3. Bb5: Ruy Lopez
 3...a6: Ruy Lopez, Morphy Defence (main line)
 3...Nf6: Ruy Lopez, Berlin Defence
 3...d6: Ruy Lopez, Steinitz Defence
 3...f5: Ruy Lopez, Schliemann Defence
 3...Bc5: Ruy Lopez, Classical Defence
3. Bc4: Italian Game
 3...Bc5: Giuoco Piano
 3...Nf6: Two Knights Defence
 3...d6: Semi-Italian Opening
3. d4: Scotch Game
3. Nc3: Three Knights Game
 3...Nf6: Four Knights Game
 3...g6: Three Knights Game (main)
3. c3: Ponziani Opening

Other Black defenses
Of the alternatives, 2...Nf6 (Petrov's Defense) is considered fully respectable and is common in grandmaster games. Philidor's Defense is playable but is seen more rarely.
2...Nf6: Petrov's Defense (C42)
2...d6: Philidor's Defense (C41)

Less common defenses
A number of less popular continuations are possible.  These openings are generally considered to be less sound than those mentioned above. These openings are all categorized in the ECO under code C40.
 2...f5: Latvian Gambit
 2...d5: Elephant Gambit
 2...Qe7: Gunderam Defense
 2...f6: Damiano Defence 
 2...Qf6: Greco Defence

References

 Batsford Chess Openings 2 (1989, 1994). Garry Kasparov, Raymond Keene. .

External links

 Analysis at Chessgames.com

Chess openings